Eric Ati (born October 17, 1988) is a Cameroonian footballer who plays for the Georgia Revolution FC of the National Premier Soccer League.

Career
On August 30, 2011, Ati became the first player to sign to Atlanta from the Reserves.

Ati signed with Wilmington Hammerheads on January 22, 2016.

On April 14, 2018 he signed with the Georgia Revolution FC.

Coaching career 
Since 2010, he has been as a member of The Southern Crescent Goalkeeping Academy Staff.

References

External links
NAIA Career Stats
Atlanta Silverbacks bio

1988 births
Living people
Cameroonian footballers
Cameroonian expatriate footballers
Atlanta Silverbacks players
Charlotte Independence players
Wilmington Hammerheads FC players
Expatriate soccer players in the United States
North American Soccer League players
USL Championship players
Cameroonian football managers
Cameroonian expatriate football managers
Association football goalkeepers